Ikunum was a king of Assyria  1934–1921 BC and the son of Ilushuma. He built a temple for the god Ninkigal. He strengthened the fortifications of the city of Assur and maintained commercial colonies in Asia Minor. The following is a list of the sixteen annually-elected limmu officials from the year of accession of Ikunum until the year of his death.

1934 BC Buzi son of Adad-rabi
1933 BC Šuli son of Šalmah
1932 BC Iddin-Suen son of Šalmah
1931 BC Ikunum son of Šudaya
1930 BC Dan-Wer son of Ahu-ahi
1929 BC Šu-Anum from Nerabtim
1928 BC Il-massu son of Aššur-ṭab
1927 BC Šu-Hubur son of Šuli
1926 BC Idua son of Ṣulili
1925 BC Laqip son of Puzur-Laba
1924 BC Šu-Anum the hapirum
1923 BC Uku son of Bila
1922 BC Aššur-malik son of Panaka
1921 BC Dan-Aššur son of Puzur-Wer

Notes

References

Year of birth unknown

20th-century BC deaths
20th-century BC Assyrian kings